The Dakota Kid is a 1951 American Western film directed by Philip Ford and starring Michael Chapin, Eilene Janssen and James Bell.

The film's sets were designed by the art director Frank Hotaling.

Plot

Cast

References

Bibliography
 Pitts, Michael R. Western Movies: A Guide to 5,105 Feature Films. McFarland, 2012.

External links
 
 
 
 

1951 films
1951 Western (genre) films
American Western (genre) films
Films directed by Philip Ford
Republic Pictures films
American black-and-white films
1950s English-language films
1950s American films